The John Lee McFarlin House,  also known as the A.D. Lester House, is a historic house located at 305 East King Street in Quincy, Florida.  It was added to the National Register of Historic Places in 1974.

It is a Queen Anne-style house built for John Lee McFarlin in 1895 or 1896.  Its NRHP nomination reports:Compared to Queen Anne houses in other parts of the country, McFarlin's house may seem restrained, but in Gadsden County it is an extravaganza. It is a testament to a time when the function of a decorative turret was "to show that the owner could afford to build a home with decorative turrets."

References

Gallery

External links

 Gadsden County listings at Florida's Office of Cultural and Historical Programs

Houses in Gadsden County, Florida
Houses on the National Register of Historic Places in Florida
Bed and breakfasts in Florida
National Register of Historic Places in Gadsden County, Florida
Queen Anne architecture in Florida
1890s establishments in Florida